The Auk Oilfield is situated  east, southeast of Aberdeen, Scotland, in block number 30/16.

Reservoir 
It was discovered in October 1970 in a water depth of 182 metres. The oil has an API gravity of 38 degrees  and a gas-oil-ratio of 155 scf/bbl.

Infrastructure 
The Auk 'A' platform was a steel, 8 legged jacket designed by Shell Oil and constructed at Methil, Fife, Scotland. The jacket weighs 3,414 tonnes, it was installed in July 1974 and supported a topside weight of around 8,000 tonnes.

Operator 
It was  operated by Shell UK Exploration and Production Ltd, in 50% partnership with Esso until October 2006 when it was bought by Talisman Energy, and is now licensed by Repsol Sinopec Resources UK Ltd.

The field is named after the Auk a family of sea birds. Myles Bowen, Shell's Exploration Manager in 1970, had a keen interest in ornithology and began the naming convention of birds. There is an (entirely fanciful) legend that it was to be called A UK, as the first British oilfield, until somebody realised that the sixth field would be called F UK and Shell's policy was rapidly changed to name their fields after sea birds. Shells sixth UK oilfield is called Fulmar.

Production 
Production started in December 1975 from the Auk 'A' platform.

The topsides facilities included capability to drill, produce meter and pump oil. There were 10 well slots with 6 initially drilled. The plant has a capacity of 80,000 barrels of oil per day, Production start up was in December 1975. Initially production was to an ELSBM and then to the Fulmar Alpha platform in August 1986.The Exposed Location Single Buoy Mooring (ELSBM) has a height of 74 metres and stands in a water depth of 86 metres. It comprises a helideck, a mooring trunk, a mooring rope reel turntable buoyancy compartments and a ballast compartment. It is anchored to the seabed by eight 13.5 tonne anchors and 600 metre chains. It is supplied with oil through two 10 inch diameter hoses.

Associated gas from the reservoir was separated and used to power electrical generation with the excess being flared.

Oil production (in thousands of barrels) was as follows:

See also
Energy policy of the United Kingdom
Energy use and conservation in the United Kingdom

References

North Sea oil fields
Oil fields of Scotland
Shell plc oil and gas fields